Events in the year 1859 in India.

Incumbents
Charles Canning, Viceroy

Events
 The Indian rebellion of 1857 ends (formally declared in July).
The execution of Tatya Tope (Ramachandra Pandurang Tope), 18 April, a Maratha leader in the Indian Rebellion of 1857, occurs. 
 Indigo revolt

Law
Limitation Act
Civil Procedure Code
East India Loan Act (British statute)
Evidence By Commission Act (British statute)
Royal Naval Reserve (Volunteer) Act (British statute)
British Law Ascertainment Act (British statute)

 
India
Years of the 19th century in India

//